Annie from Tharau is a 1954 West German romance film directed by Wolfgang Schleif and starring Ilse Werner, Heinz Engelmann, Helmuth Schneider. It takes its name from a historic song of the same title and was part of the post-war tradition of heimatfilm in German cinema.

It was shot at the Tempelhof Studios in Berlin and on location across Bavaria. The film's sets were designed by the art director Wilhelm Vorwerg.

Cast
 Ilse Werner as Anna "Ännchen" Wittkuhn
 Heinz Engelmann as Ulrich Lessau
 Helmuth Schneider as Adrian Rotenbach
 Klaus-Ulrich Krause as Utz Wittkuhn
 Albert Florath as Tobias Rotenbach
 Elsa Wagner as Babette Rotenbach
 Bruno Hübner as Dr. Bruns
 Stanislav Ledinek as Lobsam
 Karl Hellmer as Willuweit
 Margarete Haagen as Gru Gutjahr
 Paul Heidemann as Herr Selke
 Blandine Ebinger as Frau Selke
 Loni Heuser as Alma Möske
 Brigitte Rau as Trudel Möske
 Ludwig Schmitz as Ali Schnurre
 Hans Hermann Schaufuß as Wehrle
 Rolf Weih as Grabner

References

Bibliography
 Bock, Hans-Michael & Bergfelder, Tim. The Concise CineGraph. Encyclopaedia of German Cinema. Berghahn Books, 2009.

External links 
 

1954 films
1950s romance films
German romance films
West German films
1950s German-language films
Films directed by Wolfgang Schleif
Films shot at Tempelhof Studios
German black-and-white films
1950s German films